That's the Spirit is a 1945 American comedy film directed by Charles Lamont and written by Michael Fessier and Ernest Pagano. The film stars Peggy Ryan, Jack Oakie, June Vincent, Gene Lockhart, Johnny Coy, Andy Devine, Arthur Treacher, Irene Ryan and Buster Keaton. The film was released on June 1, 1945, by Universal Pictures.

Plot

Cast        
Peggy Ryan as Sheila Gogarty
Jack Oakie as Steve 'Slim' Gogarty
June Vincent as Libby Cawthorne Gogarty
Gene Lockhart as Jasper Cawthorne
Johnny Coy as Martin Wilde Jr.
Andy Devine as Martin Wilde Sr.
Arthur Treacher as Masters
Irene Ryan as Bilson
Buster Keaton as L.M.
Victoria Horne as Patience
Edith Barrett as Abigail
Rex Storey as Specialty

See also
 List of films about angels

References

External links
 

1945 films
American comedy films
1945 comedy films
Universal Pictures films
Films directed by Charles Lamont
Films scored by Hans J. Salter
American black-and-white films
1940s English-language films
1940s American films